Frederick G. Nolan (July 5, 1927 – June 4, 2016) was a Canadian land surveyor as well as a known Oak Island treasure hunter. He appeared on the History Channel's TV series about the island, The Curse of Oak Island, in episodes 7 and 8 of season 3.

Career as land surveyor

Nolan was one of the first land surveyors in the province of Nova Scotia to receive designation as a Provincial Land Surveyor. With his brother, he opened a surveying company called Nolan Brothers Surveys. Some of their notable works include the layout of the entire Westmount Subdivision at the site of the old Halifax airport on Chebucto Road. Another was the site of the first Sobeys store in Halifax Regional Municipality.

Oak Island

Nolan became interested in the history of Oak Island and its supposed treasure, studying documents and maps from maritime libraries and museums. During this exploration of over fifty years, he uncovered numerous unexplained markings and artifacts from Oak Island's terrain. Nolan also found a cross made of boulders on his property on the island. He maintained his interest in this quest until his death, in 2016.

Life

Nolan was born on July 5, 1927, in Halifax, Nova Scotia, to parents Thomas and Catherine Pierce. He died after a short illness on June 4, 2016, at the age of 88.

References

1927 births
2016 deaths
Oak Island
People from Halifax, Nova Scotia
Treasure hunters